The Unicorn Stakes (Japanese ユニコーンステークス) is a Grade 3 horse race for three-year-old Thoroughbreds run in June over a distance of 1600 metres on dirt at Tokyo Racecourse.

The race was first run in 1996 and has held Grade 3 status ever since. The race was run over 1800 metres at Nakayama Racecourse in 1996, 1998, 1999 and 2000. Past winners of the race have included Taiki Shuttle, Agnes Digital and Kane Hekili.

Records
Record time (1600 metres):
 1:34.9 - Cafe Pharoah 2020

Most wins by a jockey:
 2 - Yukio Okabe 1996, 1997
 2 - Katsumi Ando 2003, 2008
 2 - Yutaka Take 2005, 2007
 2 - Yuichi Fukunaga 2012, 2019

Most wins by a trainer:
 2 - Sei Ishizaka  2001, 2013
 2 - Katsuhiko Sumii  2005, 2019
 2 - Noriyuki Hori   2012, 2020

Winners  

 Gold Tiara and I Am Actress were fillies

See also
 Horse racing in Japan
 List of Japanese flat horse races

References

Dirt races in Japan